Ritra is a butterfly genus in the family Lycaenidae. It is found in  the Indomalayan realm .

Species
Ritra aurea (Druce, 1873)

References

Cheritrini
Lycaenidae genera
Taxa named by Lionel de Nicéville